The Kryptotrochozoa (incl. Entoprocta + Ectoprocta) are a proposed Lophotrochozoa clade. It consists of the Nemertea and Lophophorata. It is controversial.

References 

Lophotrochozoa